Pinguicula vulgaris, the common butterwort, is a perennial carnivorous plant in the bladderwort family, Lentibulariaceae.

Description
It grows to a height of 3–16 cm, and is topped with a purple, and occasionally white, flower that is 15 mm or longer, and shaped like a funnel. This butterwort grows in damp environments such as bogs and swamps, in low or subalpine elevations. Being native to environments with cold winters, they produce a winter-resting bud (hibernaculum). There are three forms originating from Europe: P. vulgaris f. bicolor which has petals that are white and purple; P. vulgaris f. albida which has all white petals; and P. vulgaris f. alpicola which has larger flowers. The taxonomic status of these forms is not universally recognised - see e.g. The Plant List.

Common butterwort is an insectivorous plant. Its leaves have glands that excrete a sticky fluid which traps insects to its leaves; its glands also produce digestive enzymes which work to consume the insects externally. This serves as a way for the plant to access a source of nitrogen as they generally grow in soil that is acidic and low in nutrients, such as bogs. Insect capture is an adaptation to nutrient-poor conditions, and the plant is highly dependent on insects for nitrogen.

Distribution
It has a generally circumboreal distribution, being native to almost every country in Europe as well as Russia, Canada, and the United States. It is generally found growing in places such as bogs, fens, alvars, and other areas with limestone bedrock and alkaline waters.

References

External links
USDA Plants Profile
Forest Service Ecology

Carnivorous plants of North America
vulgaris
Plants described in 1753
Taxa named by Carl Linnaeus